Donovan is a village in Beaver Township, Iroquois County, Illinois, United States. The population was 304 at the 2010 census.

History
Donovan was laid out in 1872 and named for the local Donovan family.

Geography
Donovan is located in northeastern Iroquois County at  (40.884031, -87.615746). U.S. Route 52 passes through the village, leading west and north  to Kankakee and southeast  to Kentland, Indiana.

Demographics

As of the census of 2000, there were 351 people, 132 households, and 97 families residing in the village. The racial makeup of the village was 96.30% White, 0.85% African American, 0.85% Native American, 1.42% from other races, and 0.57% from two or more races. Hispanic or Latino of any race were 5.13% of the population.

There were 132 households, out of which 37.9% had children under the age of 18 living with them, 56.1% were married couples living together, 12.9% had a female householder with no husband present, and 26.5% were non-families. 24.2% of all households were made up of individuals, and 15.2% had someone living alone who was 65 years of age or older.  The average household size was 2.66 and the average family size was 3.10.

In the village, the population was spread out, with 30.8% under the age of 18, 6.6% from 18 to 24, 30.2% from 25 to 44, 17.1% from 45 to 64, and 15.4% who were 65 years of age or older.  The median age was 36 years. For every 100 females there were 84.7 males.  For every 100 females age 18 and over, there were 82.7 males.

The median income for a household in the village was $42,083, and the median income for a family was $46,429. Males had a median income of $37,083 versus $22,500 for females. The per capita income for the village was $22,215.  About 1.0% of families and 4.1% of the population were below the poverty line, including 0.7% of those under age 18 and 5.4% of those age 65 or over.

References

Villages in Iroquois County, Illinois
1872 establishments in Illinois
Populated places established in 1872